Jazlyn Alexa Oviedo Reyes (born 25 March 2002) is an American-born Dominican footballer who plays as a midfielder for the Monmouth Hawks and the Dominican Republic women's national team.

International career
Oviedo has appeared for the Dominican Republic at the 2020 CONCACAF Women's Olympic Qualifying Championship qualification.

International goals
Scores and results list Dominican Republic's goal tally first.

Personal life
Oviedo was born in the United States to a Peruvian father and a Dominican mother. Raised in Clifton, New Jersey, Oviedo played prep soccer for DePaul Catholic High School. Her sister Alyssa Oviedo is also a member of the Dominican Republic women's national football team.

References

External links

2002 births
Living people
Citizens of the Dominican Republic through descent
DePaul Catholic High School alumni
Dominican Republic women's footballers
Women's association football midfielders
Dominican Republic women's international footballers
Dominican Republic people of Peruvian descent
Sportspeople from Clifton, New Jersey
Soccer players from New Jersey
American women's soccer players
Monmouth Hawks women's soccer players
American sportspeople of Peruvian descent
American sportspeople of Dominican Republic descent